Cataract River, a mostly perennial stream of the Clarence River catchment, is located in the Northern Tablelands district of New South Wales, Australia.

Course and features
Cataract River rises on the eastern slopes of the Great Dividing Range, near Red Hill, southeast of Tenterfield and flows generally north northeast, north, and northeast, joined by six minor tributaries before reaching its confluence with the Clarence River, near Paddys Flat. The river descends  over its  course; and flows through the Basket Swamp National Park and the Boonoo Boonoo National Park.

Between Timbara Road and Sandy Hill, the course of the Cataract River is generally adjacent to the Bruxner Highway.

See also

 Rivers of New South Wales

References

 

Rivers of New South Wales
Northern Rivers